Stu MacGregor is a Canadian ice hockey executive. Since 2007 he has held the position of Director of Amateur Scouting for the Edmonton Oilers of the National Hockey League (NHL). MacGregor was fired in 2015 from the Edmonton Oilers. Later that October joined the Kamloops Blazers management team.

MacGregor was the general manager for the Kamloops Blazers of the Western Hockey League from 1995 to 1998, before taking a scouting position with the Dallas Stars of the NHL. He joined the Edmonton Oilers in 2000, and in 2008 he replaced Kevin Prendergast as the Oilers' Director of Amateur Scouting.

References

External links
Stu MacGregor's staff ptofile at Eliteprospects.com

Living people
Dallas Stars scouts
Edmonton Oilers scouts
Ice hockey people from Alberta
National Hockey League executives
Year of birth missing (living people)